Ras-related protein Rab-1A is a protein that in humans is encoded by the RAB1A gene.

Interactions 

RAB1A has been shown to interact with:

 CHML, 
 GOLGA2,
 GOLGA5, 
 MICAL1 
 RABAC1,  and
 CHM.

References

Further reading